Ayumi Oka may refer to:

 Ayumi Oka (actress) (born 1983), Japanese actress
 Ayumi Oka (tennis) (born 1986), Japanese female tennis player